The simple-station Avenida 39 is part of the TransMilenio mass-transit system of Bogotá, Colombia, opened in the year 2000.

Location
The station is located north of downtown Bogotá, specifically on Avenida Caracas between Calles 39 and 37.

History
In 2000, phase one of the TransMilenio system was opened between Portal de la 80 and Tercer Milenio, including this station.

The station is named Avenida 39 due to its proximity to that arterial route.

The service also covers the demand of the Universidad Javeriana and the passengers of the La Magdalena, Teusaquillo, Sucre, Sagrado Corazón, and Parque Nacional neighborhoods.

On March 9, 2012, protests lodged by mostly young children in groups of up to 200, blocked in several times and up to 3 hours in the trunk stations Caracas. The protests left destroyed and sacked this season of the system.

Station services

Old trunk services

Main line service

Feeder routes
This station does not have connections to feeder routes.

Inter-city service
This station does not have inter-city service.

See also
 Bogotá
 TransMilenio
 List of TransMilenio Stations

External links
 TransMilenio
 suRumbo.com

TransMilenio